The culture of Rwanda is varied. Unlike many other countries in Africa, Rwanda has been a unified state since precolonial times, populated by the Banyarwanda people who share a single language and cultural heritage. Eleven regular national holidays are observed throughout the year, with others occasionally inserted by the government.

The week following Genocide Memorial Day on 7 April is designated an official week of mourning. The last Saturday of each month is umuganda, a national day of community service, during which most normal services close down.

Music and dance 

Music and dance are an integral part of Rwandan ceremonies,  festivals, social gatherings, and storytelling. The most famous traditional dance is Intore, a highly choreographed routine consisting of three components - the ballet, performed by women; the dance of heroes, performed by men, and the drums. Traditionally, music is transmitted orally with styles varying between the social groups. Drums are of great importance, the royal drummers having enjoyed high status within the court of the mwami. Drummers usually play together in groups of seven or nine.

Rwanda has a growing popular music industry, influenced by East African, Congolese and American music. The most popular genres are hip-hop and R&B, often blended with ragga and dance-pop. Popular local artists include The Ben and Meddy, both of whom have won awards, and more recent artists like Miss Shanel, Kitoko, Riderman, Tom Close, King James,  Mani Martin,  Knowless,  Charly na Nina and others.

Cuisine 
 

Rwandan cuisine is based on local staple foods produced by the traditional subsistence agriculture. Historically, it has varied among the country's different ethnic groups. Rwandan staples include bananas, plantains (known as ibitoke), pulses, sweet potatoes, beans, and cassava (manioc). Many Rwandans do not eat meat more than a few times a month. For those who live near lakes and have access to fish, tilapia is popular.

The potato, thought to have been introduced to Rwanda by German and Belgian colonialists, is now also very popular. Ugali (or ubugali) is a paste made from cassava or maize and water, to form a porridge-like consistency that is eaten throughout East Africa. Isombe is made from mashed cassava leaves and served with dried fish.

Lunch is usually a buffet known as melange, consisting of the above staples and possibly meat. Brochette is the most popular food when eating out in the evening, usually made from goat, but sometimes tripe, beef, pork or fish. In rural areas, many bars have a brochette seller responsible for tending and slaughtering the goats, skewering and barbecuing the meat, and serving it with grilled bananas.

Milk, particularly in a fermented form called ikivuguto, is a common drink throughout the country. Other drinks include a traditional beer called urwagwa, made from sorghum or bananas, which features in traditional rituals and ceremonies. Commercial beers brewed in Rwanda include Primus, Mützig, and Amstel.

Arts and crafts 
Traditional arts and crafts are produced throughout the country, although most originated as functional items rather than purely for decoration. Woven baskets and bowls are especially common.

The south east of Rwanda is noted for imigongo, a unique cow dung art, whose history dates back to when the region was part of the independent Gisaka kingdom. The dung is mixed with natural soils of various colours and painted into patterned ridges, forming geometric shapes.

Otherart and crafts include pottery/ceramic, painting and wood carving are made mostly by artist students from Ecole d'Art de Nyundo, the unique school of art Rwanda had from 1959 until today, wherever they are another different institutions who are trying to train visual and audio arts in this days.

Housing 
The quantity of housing production is still low and its cost does not match the purchasing power of the majority.
Most urban residents still access housing through informal practices, because the formal sector cannot offer housing access schemes which cater to all.
 
A number of circumstances result in the
situation where most housing developments address only a minority of customers, among whom demand has not even been saturated yet.

Currently, while Kigali hosts about half of the urban population in Rwanda, a Housing Market Study for Kigali (2012-22) estimates that total housing needs (2012-22) reach 458,256 units, of which 344,068 are newly to be constructed. Broken down to different purchasing powers, this was translated to:
 
-43,436 units for social housing (12.6%);
- 186,163 units for affordable housing (54.1%);
- 112,867 units for mid-range housing (32.8%); and
- 1,601 units for premium housing (0.5%), for Kigali alone.

Countrywide, the demand has not been thoroughly researched yet and studies are in preparation; it is estimated double of the total need in Kigali.

The achievements of the recent years relate to improved participation in planning, openness to the use of local materials in construction, and the equal acknowledgement of tenure rights. Risen awareness, small scale research, and project trials in the housing sector have contributed to this. The improvement of neighbourhood planning and of the general urban planning framework is underway, which provides for consistency in planning and development management.
 
Despite the constraints which still exist in housing finance, lending conditions have improved through the introduction of longer credit terms,
slightly reducing interest rates, a larger and more accessible variety in terms of down-payment options, and improvements in the accessibility of the building permitting system in relation to mortgage rules (National Housing Policy).

Housing Development 

The Government engages in partnerships for housing development for a sustainable, mixed-use housing neighbourhood development based on a PPP model first tested in 2008 when 250 low cost houses were built, which among other innovations made local materials bankable. An estimated 22,000
housing units are currently in different stages of preparation, to be developed by the private sector with government support.

There is a 2-fold strategy to
1) trigger large scale investment into affordable housing and create competition by using the identified and available land, and
2) trigger and facilitate medium- to smallscale
investment into affordable housing through collaborative development schemes, which would enable small landholders, participate in development in form of cooperatives or as investment shareholders.

The local production of construction material is gradually being increased, e.g. local production of cement, of improved and environmentally friendlier bricks, and new, innovative and home-made solutions for structural and non-structural walling materials. See attached photo.

The Housing Sector and the Construction Industry are continuously growing in Rwanda. The Construction Industry plays an important role in the development strategy of any country that goes beyond its share in national output. Many writers have referred to its effect on employment creation, others to its multiplier effects in the national economy.

It is the great flexibility of construction activity in adjusting to different framework conditions that makes this particular sector of the economy a major contributor to the process of economic growth and development (Lopes et al., 2002).
see attached growth curve Aligned with our national program and strategies, Vision 2020, Economic Development and Poverty Reduction Strategy II (EDPRSII), Urban and Rural Settlement Sector Strategic Plan (2012/13-17/18), the role of the Ministry in the sector is to establish policies, strategies and program that will ensure that:

- The safety and the general welfare of its population is prioritized;

- The development of the sector contributes to the national economic growth;

- The land is used efficiently;

- Energy efficiency and environmentally friendly construction is encouraged;

- The local production of construction material is facilitated; and

- The private sector is empowered to drive the sector.

Literature and film 
Rwanda does not have a long history of written literature, but there is a strong oral tradition ranging from poetry to folk stories. In particular the pre-colonial royal court developed traditions of ibitekerezo (epic musical poetry), ubucurabwenge (royal genealogies typically recited at coronation ceremonies), and ibisigo (royal poems). Many of the country's moral values and details of history have been passed down through the generations. The most famous Rwandan literary figure was Alexis Kagame (1912–1981), who carried out and published research into the oral tradition as well as writing his own poetry.

The Rwandan Genocide resulted in the emergence a literature of witness accounts, essays and fiction by a new generation of writers such as Benjamin Sehene.  A number of films have been produced about the genocide, including the Golden Globe nominated Hotel Rwanda and Shooting Dogs, which was filmed in Rwanda itself, and featured survivors in the cast.

See also
 Languages of Rwanda
 List of writers from Rwanda
 Kunyaza

Notes

References
 
 
 
 

Rwandan culture